Michael J Pye (born 1944), is a male former boxer who competed for England.

Boxing career
He represented England and won a bronze medal in the 51 kg flyweight at the 1962 British Empire and Commonwealth Games in Perth, Western Australia.

He was a member of the Harris Lebus Boxing Club and was 1962 Amateur Boxing Association British flyweight champion.

References

1944 births
English male boxers
Commonwealth Games medallists in boxing
Commonwealth Games bronze medallists for England
Boxers at the 1962 British Empire and Commonwealth Games
Living people
Flyweight boxers
Medallists at the 1962 British Empire and Commonwealth Games